Warren Consolidated Schools is a public school district serving the cities of Warren, Sterling Heights and Troy, Michigan.  It operates 25 schools including two specialized partial-day high schools that draw from the other schools within the district.  Warren Consolidated has about 14,000 students and a student/teacher ratio of 25:1.

Wilkerson Elementary School is named after a dedicated school teacher, Irene Wilkerson. After retirement, she resided in Poplar Bluff, Missouri until her death.

Board Of Education
Brian White
Susan Jozwik
Leah A. Berdy
Carl Weckerle
Megan E. Papasian-Broadwell
I. Susan Kattula
Susan G. Trombley

History
Warren Consolidated was formed by 1941, when the North school became part of it. Also known as the Berz school,  it was located on the West side of Mound just South of 15 Mile Road. That school was sold in August 1952.

Special programs
Warren Consolidated alerts non-English speaking parents of disciplinary issues and emergencies using a "language line" system with interpreters.

Schools

Elementary schools
 Margaret Black Elementary School - Sterling Heights
 Irma Cromie Elementary School - Warren
 Green Acres Elementary School - Warren
 Homer Harwood Elementary School - Sterling Heights
 Sven Holden Elementary School - Sterling Heights
 Thomas Jefferson Elementary School - Sterling Heights
 Pearl O. Lean Elementary School - Warren
 Margaret Susick Elementary School - Troy
 John Siersma Elementary School  - Warren
 Maurice Wilde Elementary School - Warren
 Irene Wilkerson Elementary School - Warren
 Willow Woods Elementary School - Sterling Heights

Middle schools
Agnes E. Beer Middle School - Warren
Virgil I. Grissom Middle School - Sterling Heights
Lois E. Carter Middle School - Warren
Will Carleton Middle School - Sterling Heights
Middle School Mathematics Science Technology Center (Known as MS2TC and Butcher) - Warren
Middle School Visual & Performing Arts Center (Known as MSVPA) - Warren

High schools

 Paul K. Cousino High School
 Warren Mott High School
 Sterling Heights High School (est. 1971)
 Community High School (alternative high school)
 Career Preparation Center
 Macomb Mathematics Science Technology Center
 Warren Consolidated School of Performing Arts

Learning Centers
Hatherly Educational Center
 It was previously operated as Hatherly Elementary School. In 2014 the district announced that Hatherly Elementary would close, with the building becoming Hatherly Educational Center. The center received the Macomb County Head Start Program, the district Early Childhood Special Education (ECSE), the Great Start Readiness Program (GSRP) or "World of Fours", and the district's tuition-based preschool. These programs were respectively hosted at Lean Elementary School and Fillmore Year-Round Elementary School, Siersma Year-Round Elementary School, Holden Elementary School, and Siersma Year-Round, and Willow Woods Elementary School, respectively.
Annie Flynn Educational Center (Sterling Heights)
 The center, located in proximity to Metropolitan Parkway and Ryan Road, was previously operated as Annie E. Flynn Middle School. In 2014 the district announced that Flynn Middle would close, with the building becoming Flynn Educational Center. Community High School and Adult Education English as a Second Language (ESL) were to move to Flynn, with the former coming from Butcher Educational Center and the latter from Sterling Heights High.
 As of 2011, the school had 640 students. Almost 66% of the students were bilingual in English and another language, and the majority of the students were second generations in immigrant families. Former principal Charles Kluka characterized the school's environment as a salad bowl instead of a melting pot. The most common foreign languages spoken at Flynn were Albanian and Arabic. Other students were Assyrian, Bosnian, Cantonese, Filipino, Hmong, Indian, Korean, and Vietnamese, and there were 26 primary home languages among the Flynn students. The school had an English as a second language program with over 50 students, and it provided three interpreters who assist persons during special events held at night and in classrooms during school hours.
Butcher Education Center
Previously operated as Thomas Butcher Junior High School until 1982, it has housed the Macomb Mathematics Science Technology Center since 1989, the Middle School Mathematics Science Technology Center since 2013, and the Middle School Visual and Performing Arts program since 2014. It also previously housed Community High School until 2014, when it was transferred to Flynn Educational Center following its opening.

Former Schools

Several schools once in the district have been closed:
Angus Elementary school - closed in 2019 - currently Angus Educational Center 
Monfort Elementary - Located on 14 Mile Rd. between Maple Lane & Red Run. (closed 1958)
Warren High School - closed in 1992 - current Warren Community Center, owned by the City of Warren
Oscar Hartsig Junior High School - closed in 1981 - currently sitting empty after being Ben Ross Public School Academy(closed 2011) and Conner Creek Academy Warren
Thomas Butcher Junior High School - closed in 1982 - currently Butcher Educational Center
Ernest O. Melby Junior High School - closed in 1985 - currently Regina High School
John C. Fuhrmann Junior High School - closed in 2003 - demolished in 2012
Annie E. Flynn Middle School - closed in 2014 - currently Flynn Educational Center
Hatherly Elementary School - closed in 2014 - currently Hatherly Educational Center
Albert Bever Elementary School - closed in 1978 - currently WCS Administration Building
County Line Elementary School - closed in 1978 - currently a shopping center at the corner of 15 Mile & Dequindre
Helen Fillmore Elementary School - closed in 2015
Robert Frost Elementary School - closed in 1980 - demolished in 2006
John S. Haitema Elementary School - closed in 1992 - sold to MISD
Robert J. Hesse Elementary School - closed in 1980 - currently an area of condominiums
John F. Holland Elementary School - closed in 1981 - used during the summers until the mid-1980s by the City of Warren Parks & Recreation Dept. - demolished in 1993 - currently a subdivision
Charles J. Marshall Elementary School - closed in 1980
Maple Lane Elementary School - closed in 1980 - sold to MISD
William E. Murthum Elementary School - closed in 1978 - partially demolished in 1987, and then totally demolished in 1992
North Elementary School - closed in 1992 - demolished in 1993 - currently condominiums
William H. Pennow Elementary School - closed in 1981 - currently a business
William Pfromm Education Center - closed in 2010 
Frank A. Rinke Elementary School - closed in 1981 - currently Macomb Christian School
Norman Rockwell Elementary School - closed in 1978? - sold to MISD - currently Norman Rockwell Junior High School
Alan B. Shepard Elementary School - closed in 1981 - demolished - currently a church
South Elementary School - closed in 1984 - demolished in 1992 - currently a subdivision
Jim Thorpe Elementary School - closed in 2003 - used for Sterling Heights Police Department Training - demolished in 2006
Gordon J. Warner Elementary School - closed in 1993 - demolished in 2012
Louise B. Weber Elementary School - closed in 1979 - demolished - currently a subdivision
Warren East Elementary School
Warren West Elementary School
Wildwood Elementary School - closed in 1978 - currently Immaculate Conception School

References

External links

 Warren Consolidated Web Site

School districts in Michigan
Education in Macomb County, Michigan
Education in Oakland County, Michigan
1941 establishments in Michigan
Troy, Michigan
School districts established in 1941